Lloyd Hartman Elliott ( – ) was President of the George Washington University from 1965 to 1988. He was born in Crosby, Clay County, West Virginia in 1918. He was also a professor of educational administration at Cornell University and President of the University of Maine.

Career
Elliott got his training as a history teacher at Glenville State College and was principal of the Widen, West Virginia, school system from 1939 to 1942. He earned a master's degree from the University of West Virginia. He was a lieutenant commander in the U.S. Naval Reserve during World War II, and earned a PhD in educational administration at the University of Colorado. He became superintendent of schools for Boulder, Colorado, in 1947.

University career
Elliott became a faculty member at Cornell University in 1948, becoming a professor of educational administration in 1951. On 1 July 1956 he became executive assistant to the President of the University. In 1958 Elliott became President of the University of Maine, awarding President John F. Kennedy an honorary doctorate in October 1963. Elliott resigned in 1965 to become President of GWU, though some faculty members opposed his appointment. He retired in July 1988. His style was gentler than that of his successor Stephen Trachtenberg: a trustee at GWU said that "The conservative guy from West Virginia had been succeeded by the kid from Brooklyn,".   Meanwhile, some faculty posited that Elliott had done too little to recruit top faculty and students.

The GWU's School of International Affairs was renamed as the Elliott School of International Affairs in 1988 in his honor. He and his wife established the Evelyn E. and Lloyd H. Elliott Fund, to support a professorship and other activities of the school.

Business
Elliott served as the board members at American Security Bank, Bell Atlantic, National Geographic Society, Perpetual Building Association and Woodward & Lothrop, and he was included in the Washington Business Hall of Fame in 1990. He was the first president of the National Geographic Society Education Foundation.

Personal life
Elliott was raised in Clay County, West Virginia, where his father was a schoolteacher and ran a farm. Elliott's wife Evelyn, known as Betty, died in the year 2009 aged 91. Together they had two children (Patricia and Gene), two grandchildren ( Ryan and Bevan), and eleven great-grandchildren. He died on January 1, 2013, according to a memo released by the former President of GWU, Steven Knapp, to the entire GWU community.

Bibliography
 Elliott, Lloyd H. Unique partners in progress: the University of Maine and the pulp and paper industry. Volume 34, Issue 8 of Newcomen address, Newcomen Society in North America, 1964, 24pp.
 Elliott, Lloyd H. The university and corporate America: bridging the two worlds. National Heritage Books, 2001

References

External links
 Elliott, Lloyd Hartman, The George Washington University and Foggy Bottom Historical Encyclopedia

1918 births
2013 deaths
School superintendents in Colorado
Cornell University faculty
Educators from West Virginia
Glenville State College alumni
People from Clay County, West Virginia
Presidents of George Washington University
University of Colorado alumni
Presidents of the University of Maine
United States Navy personnel of World War II
United States Navy officers
United States Navy reservists